Hagop Baronian (pronounced in Eastern Armenian as Hakob Paronyan, traditional spelling: Յակոբ Պարոնեան, reformed spelling: Հակոբ Պարոնյան, ; 1843–1891) was an influential Ottoman Armenian writer, playwright, journalist, and educator in the 19th century.

Biography 

Born in Adrianople, Baronian is widely acknowledged as the greatest Armenian satirist of all time, closely followed by Yervant Odian. Before going to Constantinople Baronian worked as a pharmacy assistant in his hometown Adrianople.

In 1868, finally Baronian left for Constantinople in prospect of finding a job. He first worked as a tutor, and gave private lessons to members of wealthy Armenian families. Afterwards, Baronian was appointed as a teacher in Armenian seminary in Scutari, where the notable Armenian poet Bedros Tourian was among his students. In 1872, Baronian entered journalism as an editor-in-chief of different satirical magazines in the Armenian language. He continued his work in journalism until 1888, when Ottoman authorities decided to ban many magazines in Armenian, including Baronian's.

In 1891, Baronian came down with a severe case of tuberculosis, resulting in his death on 27 May that year.

Baronian's most significant works include the satirical novel Honorable Beggars (1887) and the comedies Baghdasar Aghbar (1886) and Oriental Dentist (1868). In this works Baronian aimed to show the defects of Constantinople's society in a satirical way and with an incredible sense of humor.

Baronian was also known for his biting, sarcastic criticisms of leading figures in the Armenian social circles of Istanbul; some of these critical comments appear in his book Azkayin Chocher ("National Bigshots"). Baronian himself suffered the same fate as the characters in Medzabadiv Mouratsganner, and died penniless on the streets of Istanbul. He was buried in an Armenian cemetery in Istanbul, but the precise location of his grave has been lost.

Tributes
The Yerevan State Musical Comedy Theatre was named after Hagop Baronian.

References

Parlakian, Nishan (2001). Modern Armenian Drama: An Anthology. New York: Columbia University Press, p. 61.

1843 births
1891 deaths
Armenian novelists
Armenian male novelists
Armenian educators
Armenians from the Ottoman Empire
19th-century writers from the Ottoman Empire
19th-century Armenian writers
People from Edirne
Armenian satirists
19th-century Armenian novelists
19th-century male writers